Moose Brook is a  stream in northern New Hampshire in the United States. It is a tributary of the Androscoggin River, which flows south and east into Maine, joining the Kennebec River near the Atlantic Ocean.

Moose Brook rises in the town of Randolph, in Ice Gulch, a sharp notch in the Crescent Range in the northern White Mountains. The floor of Ice Gulch is filled with giant, angular boulders under which ice can stay present throughout the summer. Moose Brook exits the gulch by dropping over Peboamauk Fall, then continues east through Moose Brook State Park to reach the Androscoggin River in the town of Gorham, New Hampshire. The brook should not be confused with the Moose River, which enters the Androscoggin less than one mile downstream of Moose Brook.

See also

List of rivers of New Hampshire

References

Rivers of New Hampshire
Rivers of Coös County, New Hampshire